Calvin Loveall (born July 23, 1962) is a former American football defensive back. He played for the Atlanta Falcons, Kansas City Chiefs and Houston Oilers in 1988.

References

1962 births
Living people
American football defensive backs
Idaho Vandals football players
Denver Gold players
Ottawa Rough Riders players
Atlanta Falcons players
Kansas City Chiefs players
Houston Oilers players